The Fusion Media Group (FMG; formerly Fusion Media Network) is a division of Univision Communications. The company was launched in April 2016 after Univision bought out Disney's stake in Fusion through the Fusion Media Network joint venture between Univision & Disney-ABC. While Univision is focused on serving Hispanic America in Spanish, FMG is the company's multi-platform, English language division targeting young adults.

Operations 
The Root, an online magazine on African-American culture, was acquired by Univision in 2015. It was eventually placed within FMG.

In January 2016, The Onion was acquired, along with its sibling properties.

Univision Story House was introduced in May 2016 as the content development and production unit of Univision, but to be managed by FMG.

In August 2016, FMG acquired the online properties of Gawker Media, excluding Gawker.com, and renamed the company Gizmodo Media Group.

In July 2018, it was reported that Univision plans on selling the Gizmodo Media Group and The Onion. In April 2019, Gizmodo Media Group and The Onion were sold to Great Hill Partners. The sale was completed on April 8, 2019, with Gizmodo Media Group and The Onion being merged to form G/O Media, Inc.

Brands 
FMG includes both online and television properties, with a combined digital reach of around 65.6 million people in May 2016.

Current assets 
 Uforia (Still active)
 Investing.com (Still active)
 The Flama (inactive)
 TrackRecord.net (inactive)
 Univision Story House (inactive)

Former assets 
 Fusion TV
 Gizmodo Media Group (now G/O Media) (formerly Gawker Media, Fusion)
 Gizmodo
 Deadspin
 Jezebel
 Lifehacker
 Jalopnik
 Kotaku
 io9
 Splinter News
 The Root
 Earther
 The Inventory
 The Takeout
 The Onion
 ClickHole (sold by G/O Media to Cards Against Humanity, now employee-owned)
 The A.V. Club

References 

 
Mass media companies of the United States
Univision
Companies based in Doral, Florida
Mass media companies established in 2016
Cable network groups in the United States